The Southern Rhodesia Legislative Council election of March 17, 1902 was the second election to the Legislative Council of Southern Rhodesia. No change was made in the administration of the elections compared with the first elections three years previously, so the Legislative Council continued to comprise ten voting members: the Administrator of Southern Rhodesia ex officio, five members nominated by the British South Africa Company, and four members elected by registered voters from two electoral districts. The Resident Commissioner of Southern Rhodesia, Sir Marshal James Clarke, also sat on the Legislative Council ex officio but without the right to vote.

Results

Note: Raleigh Grey was absent through the whole of the first session of the Legislative Council.

Additional elections
A new Order in Council promulgated in 1903 expanded the Legislative Council to fourteen members, seven to be directly elected, seven nominated by the British South Africa Company, and the Administrator to retain his seat ex officio so as to have a casting vote. Polling day was fixed for May 22, 1903.

New electoral districts were drawn up for the expanded election. The Northern District, returning two members, and the Eastern District, returning one, were carved out of Mashonaland, with the remaining parts merging with part of Matabeleland to form the Midland District (returning one member) and the Western District (returning three). In order to provide continuity, the sitting members for Mashonaland were automatically made the members for the Northern District (as it contained Salisbury), and the sitting members for Matabeleland were made members for the Western District (as it contained Bulawayo). However, before the election, Percival Ross Frames resigned his seat on the council (March 24, 1903) and so two members were elected for the Western District.

Results

Nominated members
The initial five members nominated by the British South Africa Company were:

 John Gilbert Kotzé, Attorney-General
 Sir Thomas Charles Scanlen KCMG, Additional Law Officer
 Joseph Millerd Orpen, Surveyor-General
 Townshend Griffin, Commissioner of Mines and Public Works
 Herbert Hayton Castens, Chief Secretary

During the absence of Townshend Griffin from November 7, 1902, Clarkson Henry Tredgold (Solicitor-General) stood in for him. When the membership was expanded in 1903, the nominated members were:

 Sir Thomas Charles Scanlen KCMG, Additional Law Officer
 Francis James Newton CMG, Treasurer
 Herbert Hayton Castens, Chief Secretary
 Clarkson Henry Tredgold, Attorney-General
 James Hutchison Kennedy, Master of the High Court
 Edward Ross Townsend, Secretary for Agriculture
 Ernest William Sanders Montagu, Secretary for Mines

References
 Source Book of Parliamentary Elections and Referenda in Southern Rhodesia 1898-1962 ed. by F.M.G. Willson (Department of Government, University College of Rhodesia and Nyasaland, Salisbury 1963)
 Holders of Administrative and Ministerial Office 1894-1964 by F.M.G. Willson and G.C. Passmore, assisted by Margaret T. Mitchell (Source Book No. 3, Department of Government, University College of Rhodesia and Nyasaland, Salisbury 1966)
 Official Year Book of the Colony of Southern Rhodesia, No. 1 - 1924, Salisbury, Southern Rhodesia

Southern Rhodesia
Legislative Council election
Elections in Southern Rhodesia
Non-partisan elections